

 Georg Jauer  (25 June 1896 – 5 August 1971) was a general in the Wehrmacht of Nazi Germany during World War II. He was a recipient of the Knight's Cross of the Iron Cross with Oak Leaves.

At the outbreak of World War II Jauer served as a staff officer and regimental commander. In April 1943 he was appointed commander the 20th Motorized Infantry and 20th Panzer Grenadier Division and took part in the Battle of the Kamenets-Podolsky pocket. He then led the 25th Panzer Division at the Battle of Kiev. On 12 March 1945 he took command of the 'Panzer Corps Großdeutschland' with which he surrendered.

Awards
Iron Cross (1914) 2nd Class and 1st Class
 Wound Badge (1914)  in Black
 Honour Cross of the World War 1914/1918 
 Clasp to the Iron Cross (1939) 2nd Class (2 July 1941) and 1st Class (20 July 1941)
 German Cross in Gold on 19 December 1941 as Oberst in Artillerie-Regiment 29
 Knight's Cross of the Iron Cross with Oak Leaves
 Knight's Cross on 4 May 1944 as Generalleutnant and commander of 20. Panzergrenadier-Division
 Oak Leaves on 10 February 1945 as Generalleutnant and commander of 20. Panzergrenadier-Division

References

Citations

Bibliography

 
 
 

1896 births
1971 deaths
People from Chełmno County
People from West Prussia
Generals of Panzer Troops
German Army personnel of World War I
Prussian Army personnel
Recipients of the clasp to the Iron Cross, 1st class
Recipients of the Gold German Cross
Recipients of the Knight's Cross of the Iron Cross with Oak Leaves
German prisoners of war in World War II
Reichswehr personnel
German Army generals of World War II